Tasman Knight (20 November 1906 – 22 October 1987) was an  Australian rules footballer who played with South Melbourne in the Victorian Football League (VFL).

Notes

External links 

1906 births
1987 deaths
Australian rules footballers from Victoria (Australia)
Sydney Swans players